Jessica McCaskill (born September 8, 1984) is an American professional boxer. She is a world champion in two weight classes, having held the undisputed, IBO, and Ring female welterweight titles since 2020; the WBC female super lightweight title from 2018 to 2020; and the WBA female super lightweight title from 2019 to 2020. She also challenged for the WBA lightweight title in 2017. As of September 2020, she is ranked as the world's best active female welterweight by The Ring and BoxRec, and the third best active female, pound for pound, by BoxRec, and fourth by The Ring and ESPN.

Early life
Native to Belleville, Illinois (part of Greater St. Louis), McCaskill and was raised by her great aunt and her four sons. As a child her family fell on hard times and lived in the back of a local church. In 2008 McCaskill started her amateur boxing career. In 2012 McCaskill moved to Chicago and started working as an investment banker.

Amateur career
McCaskill started boxing in 2008, just for fitness, and had her first amateur bout in April 2009. After climbing the ranks, she won the 2010 Golden Gloves award. With a 17–1 amateur record, McCaskill won the Golden Glove Championship belts in 2014 and 2015.

Professional career
McCaskill made her professional debut on August 22, 2015 with a technical knockout (TKO) victory against Tyrea Nichole Duncan at the Horseshoe Casino in Hammond, Indiana. In November 2016, McCaskill was signed by Warriors Boxing.

After fighting local boxers, McCaskill challenged Irish Olympic gold-medal boxer Katie Taylor for the WBA female lightweight title. She was defeated by Taylor via unanimous decision (98–91, 97–92, 97–92), in a fight held at the York Hall in London on December 13, 2017.

On October 6, 2018, McCaskill defeated two-weight world champion Érica Farías for the WBC female super lightweight title at the Wintrust Arena in Chicago, Illinois, winning her first world title by unanimous decision, with the judges' scorecards reading 98–92, 97–93 and 96–94.

McCaskill retained her WBC title and won the WBA female super lightweight title against Anahí Ester Sánchez via unanimous decision (99–91, 98–92, 96–94) in a bout held at the MGM National Harbor in Oxon Hill, Maryland on May 25, 2019.

On October 12, 2019, McCaskill defended her unified titles in a rematch against Érica Farías at the Wintrust Arena in Chicago. She retained her titles with a Majority decision win, with two judges scoring the bout 97–91 and 96–92 in favour of McCaskill, and the third scoring it a draw at 94–94.

In 2022, she lost to Chantelle Cameron in a match held in Abu Dhabi.

McCaskill is trained by Rick Ramos and managed by Warriors Boxing.

Professional boxing record

See also

References

External links

|}

Living people
1984 births
American women boxers
Boxers from St. Louis
Lightweight boxers
Light-welterweight boxers
Welterweight boxers
World lightweight boxing champions
World welterweight boxing champions
World Boxing Association champions
World Boxing Council champions
International Boxing Federation champions
World Boxing Organization champions
International Boxing Organization champions
The Ring (magazine) champions
21st-century American women